Stop the World I Want to Get Off is an album by vibraphonist and pianist Victor Feldman featuring tunes from Anthony Newley and Leslie Bricusse's stage musical Stop the World - I Want to Get Off recorded in 1962 and released on the World Pacific label.

Track listing
All compositions by  Anthony Newley and Leslie Bricusse.

 "Gonna Build a Mountain" – 5:15
 "ABC Song" – 4:10
 "What Kind of Fool Am I?" – 4:41
 "Lumbered" – 3:32
 "Typically English" – 4:34
 "I Wanna Be Rich" – 5:04
 "Little Boy" – 5:50

Personnel
Victor Feldman – vibraphone, piano
Bob Whitlock – bass
Lawrence Marable – drums

References

World Pacific Records albums
Victor Feldman albums
1962 albums
Covers albums